Cédric Buekers (born 17 April 1994) is a Belgian footballer who currently plays for Herk in the Belgian Provincial Leagues.

External links

1994 births
Living people
Belgian footballers
Challenger Pro League players
Belgian Pro League players
Sint-Truidense V.V. players
Oud-Heverlee Leuven players
Belgium youth international footballers
K.S.K. Heist players
Association football defenders
People from Herk-de-Stad
Footballers from Limburg (Belgium)